McKennie is a surname. Notable people with the surname include:

William McKennie (1868–1902), Scottish footballer
Weston McKennie (born 1998), American soccer player